Simon Spitzer (3 February 1826 – 2 April 1887) was an Austrian mathematician, whose work largely focused on the integration of differential equations. He was active as a writer in his field and, in addition to several independent works, published a large number of mathematical treatises in scholarly journals.

Biography
Spitzer was born in Vienna into a Jewish family originating from Nikolsburg, Moravia.

He studied mathematics at the University of Vienna, from which he graduated in 1850, and became in 1851 privatdozent at the Vienna Polytechnic Institute. In 1857 he was appointed professor of algebra at the Vienna Handelsschule, which position he held until 1887, at the same time lecturing at the Polytechnic, where he became assistant professor of analytic mechanics in 1863, and professor in 1870. When the Handelsschule was changed into the Handelsakademie Spitzer became its first rector (1872–73). From 1871 he was one of the directors of the private Österreichischen Hypotheken-Bank and a trusted advisor to the world of finance and commerce.

Spitzer was known for his irritable nature, and became involved in scientific disputes—most notably with Joseph Petzval—as the battleground for which he chose political newspapers as opposed to scholarly practice.

His granddaughter was writer Leonie Adele Spitzer.

Bibliography

References

1826 births
1887 deaths
Austro-Hungarian mathematicians
Austrian Empire Jews
Jewish scientists
Mathematicians from Vienna
Academic staff of TU Wien
University of Vienna alumni